The Scottish Junior Football East Region Premier League, was the second-highest division of the East Region of the Scottish Junior Football Association between 2006 and 2018.

History
From the 2006–07 season the East Super League was the highest tier, with the Premier League feeding down into South, Central and North divisions, replacing (but largely based upon) the old East (Lothians), Fife and Tayside leagues respectively. To populate the Premier League for its first season, three teams were relegated from the Super League and three were promoted from each of the districts – teams finishing 2nd–4th, with the winners jumping straight to the Super League. From the second season onwards, the bottom three teams were relegated (regardless of their originating location) with the three lower division winners replacing them. The Premier League winners and runners-up were promoted to the Super League, swapping with its bottom two teams. From 2013 to 2014, the Premier League was expanded to sixteen clubs and was fed by two expanded North and South divisions.

After the 2017–18 season, 24 clubs left the junior leagues to join the East of Scotland Football League, reducing the teams competing across the four leagues from 60 to 36. This led to the league to restructure from four to three leagues which consisted of two 12-team north and south sections feeding into a 12-team Super League; these were renamed the Premier League North and South but were essentially a continuation of the third tier divisions with the Premier removed from above them.

Final Members

Winners
2006–07: Glenrothes
2007–08: Bo'ness United
2008–09: Musselburgh Athletic
2009–10: Tayport
2010–11: St. Andrews United
2011–12: Sauchie
2012–13: Newtongrange Star
2013–14: Penicuik Athletic
2014–15: Tayport
2015–16: Jeanfield Swifts
2016–17: Sauchie (2)
2017–18: Musselburgh Athletic (2)

References

External links
 Premier League table at East Region SJFA
East Region Premier League at Non-League Scotland (archive version, 2007-08 membership)

2
Sports leagues established in 2006
2006 establishments in Scotland
2018 disestablishments in Scotland
Sports leagues disestablished in 2018